Tarso Ahon is a Pleistocene volcano in Tibesti, north of Emi Koussi from which it is separated by deep gorges. However, contrary to its plateau-like appearance the basaltic surfaces of Tarso Ahon are difficult to access and steep. Tarso Ahon has erupted andesite, rhyolite and similar magmas, and more recently basalts which form lava flows.

References

Sources 

 
 

Volcanoes of Chad
Pleistocene volcanoes